Clem$ is a French pop artist whose works depict the nature of an obsession with contemporary popular characters which he creates. His works which include paintings and objects belong to modern day Avantpop Art. Most of them have been exhibited in cities around the world including Miami, London, New York, Paris and Tel Aviv. Clem$'s solo exhibition is among the latest featured on EFIFO – Art Magazine and on Oh-SO-ARTY (an Israeli Guide to Contemporary Art Scene resource).

Early life
Born in 1974, the self-taught pop artist; Clem$, started drawing cartoon at an early age. He then put up his pencils for years. Later on he followed an unconventional journey in electronic music before returning to his childhood passion. Right now he devotes himself entirely to art work.

Arts career
Clem$ is an iconoclast artist. Popular figures of past and contemporary society are his subjects of choice. In his composite paintings, they are set in a wide riot of colors. Impregnated with pop and urban culture, his works witness and denounce the excesses of the present time. Clem$ main support is canvas. He paints with acrylic and brushes after sketching with charcoal.

Among his works include portraits of David Ben-Gurion, Moshe Dayan, Golda Meir, Yitzhak Rabin, Ray Charles, Mickey Mouse and others. Most of his works are in the form of cartoons and comic images which depict local characters and celebrities in the American culture. With his paintings, he also customizes objects such as scooter, guitar, trio of skateboards, fridge, chair, and a pairs of sneakers.

See also
 Avantpop
 Art exhibition
 Solo show (art exhibition)

References

External links
 

1974 births
Living people
French artists
French contemporary painters